Basil Henson (31 July 1918 – 19 December 1990) was an English actor.

Henson had a lengthy career on stage and television. His stage performances included a number of parts in Shakespeare productions, including The Merchant of Venice opposite Dustin Hoffman in London's West End and on Broadway. He also played in the original West End production of Terence Rattigan's Separate Tables at the St. James' Theatre in 1954. He appeared frequently at the National Theatre, including a part in the world premiere of Amadeus by Peter Shaffer. He had the very rare honour of having a dressing room there named after him.

He also appeared in many British films during his career. Among them Dr. Crippen (1962), the Edgar Wallace Mysteries series of second features, Darling (1965), The Frozen Dead (1966), Arthur? Arthur! (1969), The Walking Stick (1970), Cromwell (1970), The Final Programme (1973), and Galileo (1975).

Henson's television appearances included Emergency Ward 10, The Power Game, Sexton Blake, Casting the Runes, The Champions, Follyfoot, War and Peace, Fall of Eagles, the Judge, in Crown Court, and as Sir Horatio Manners in When the Boat Comes In. He also appeared as Dr. Abbott in the Fawlty Towers episode "The Psychiatrist" 1979.

Filmography

References

External links
 

1918 births
1990 deaths
English male stage actors
English male film actors
English male television actors
20th-century English male actors